David Matthew Altshuler (born August 27, 1964) is a clinical endocrinologist and human geneticist. He is Executive Vice President, Global Research and Chief Scientific Officer at Vertex Pharmaceuticals. Prior to joining Vertex in 2014, he was at the Broad Institute of Harvard and MIT, and was a Professor of Genetics and Medicine at Harvard Medical School, and in the Department of Biology at Massachusetts Institute of Technology.  He was also a faculty member in the Department of Molecular Biology, Center for Human Genetic Research, and the Diabetes Unit, all at Massachusetts General Hospital.  He was one of four Founding Core Members of the Broad Institute, and served as the Institute's Deputy Director,  Chief Academic Officer, and Director of the Program in Medical and Population Genetics.

Education
Altshuler attended Commonwealth School in Boston, received his Bachelor of Science from Massachusetts Institute of Technology, his Ph.D from Harvard University, and his M.D. from Harvard Medical School. He completed his internship, residency, and clinical fellowship training at Massachusetts General Hospital.

Research
Altshuler's academic research focused on human genetic variation and its application to disease, using information from the Human Genome Project. He has co-led the SNP Consortium, International HapMap Project, and 1000 Genomes Project   His research focused on the genetic basis of Type 2 Diabetes, and his laboratory contributed to mapping dozens of gene variants that are associated with risk of Type 2 Diabetes, lipid levels, myocardial infarction, rheumatoid arthritis, lupus, prostate cancer, and other disorders.

Awards and honors
Among his awards is election to the American Society for Clinical Investigation, the Association of American Physicians, and the Institute of Medicine. He is a member of the Board of Directors of the American Society of Human Genetics and was previously a member of the board of Vertex Pharmaceuticals.  In 2011 he won the Curt Stern Award of the American Society of Human Genetics, and in 2012 the Outstanding Scientific Achievement Award of the American Diabetes Association.  He is a member of the board of trustees of Becket Chimney Corners YMCA.

References

American geneticists
Commonwealth School alumni
Harvard Medical School alumni
Massachusetts Institute of Technology School of Science alumni
Living people
1964 births